Anything Goes is a musical by Cole Porter.

Anything Goes may also refer to:

Related to the musical 
 "Anything Goes" (Cole Porter song), the title song of the musical (and of several of the albums listed below)
 Anything Goes (1936 film), an adaptation directed by Lewis Milestone
 Anything Goes (1956 film), an adaptation directed by Robert Lewis
 Anything Goes (1989 London Cast Recording), an album

Albums 
 Anything Goes (soundtrack), by Bing Crosby, from the 1956 film
 Anything Goes (Bing Crosby album), 1962
 Anything Goes (Brad Mehldau album), 2004
 Anything Goes! (C+C Music Factory album), 1994
 Anything Goes (Florida Georgia Line album), 2014
 Anything Goes (Gary Morris album), 1985
 Anything Goes (Harpers Bizarre album), 1967
 Anything Goes (Herb Alpert album), 2009
 Anything Goes (Randy Houser album), or the title song (see below), 2008
 Anything Goes (Ron Carter album), 1975
 Anything Goes: Stephane Grappelli & Yo-Yo Ma Play (Mostly) Cole Porter, 1989
 Anything Goes! The Dave Brubeck Quartet Plays Cole Porter, 1967

Songs 
 "Anything Goes", a song in a 1974 episode of the TV series Monty Python's Flying Circus
 "Anything Goes" (Gary Morris song), 1986
 "Anything Goes" (Gregg Allman song), 1987
 "Anything Goes" (Guns N' Roses song), 1987
 "Anything Goes" (Ras Kass song), 1996
 "Anything Goes" (Randy Houser song), 2008
 "Anything Goes" (AC/DC song), 2009
 "Anything Goes!" (Maki Ohguro song), 2010
 "Anything Goes" (Florida Georgia Line song), 2015

Literature 
 Anything Goes: Origins of the Cult of Scientific Irrationalism or Popper and After, a 1982 book by David Stove
 Anything Goes! (comics), a 1980s anthology that included an appearance of the Flaming Carrot
 Anything Goes, a 2008 autobiography by John Barrowman
 Anything Goes: A Biography of the Roaring Twenties, a 2008 book by Lucy Moore

Television 
 Anything Goes (Australian TV series), a 1957 variety series that aired in Melbourne
 Anything Goes, a 1968 Australian variety show featuring Bryan Davies
 Anything Goes (Irish TV series), an Irish children's show on RTE, 1980—1986

Other uses 
 Anything Goes theorem or Sonnenschein-Mantel-Debreu Theorem, a result in equilibrium economics
Anything GOEs, figure skating website